A Very Special Christmas Live is the fourth in the A Very Special Christmas series of Christmas music-themed compilation albums produced to benefit the Special Olympics. The album was recorded live in Washington, D.C. in December 1998 at a benefit party held by then-President Bill Clinton and First Lady Hillary Clinton to celebrate the 30th anniversary of the founding of the Special Olympics. It was released on 19 October 1999, and production was overseen by Bobby Shriver for A&M Records. It peaked at #100 on December 1999 Billboard album chart.

Track listing

Personnel
 Bobby Bandiera – electric guitar, backing vocals
 Tim Cappello – alto and tenor saxophones
 Tracy Chapman – acoustic guitar on "O Holy Night", electric guitar on "Give Me One Reason"
 Eric Clapton - electric guitar on "Christmas Blues", "Christmas Tears", "Give Me One Reason", "Merry Christmas Baby" and "Santa Claus Is Coming To Town"
 Michael Mancini – keyboards
 Ed Manion – baritone saxophone
 Rob Mathes – backing vocals, bass guitar on "What Child Is This?" and "Give Me One Reason"
 Shawn Pelton – drums, percussion
 Leon Pendarvis – keyboards, backing vocals
 John Popper – harmonica on "Christmas Blues" and "Santa Claus Is Coming to Town"
 Richie "La Bamba" Rosenberg – trombone, backing vocals
 Tim Smith – electric guitar on "Merry Christmas Baby", backing vocals
 Mike Spengler – trumpet
 Andy Stoller – backing vocals, bass guitar on "O Holy Night"
 Sue Williams – bass guitar

External links
A Very Special Christmas Live at Amazon.com

1999 Christmas albums
1999 live albums
Live Christmas albums
A&M Records live albums
Interscope Records live albums
A Very Special Christmas